The National Covid Memorial Wall in London is a public mural painted by volunteers to commemorate victims of the COVID-19 pandemic in the United Kingdom. Started in March 2021 and stretching more than  along the South Bank of the River Thames, opposite the Palace of Westminster, the mural consists of approximately 150,000 red and pink hearts, intending to have one for each of the casualties of COVID-19 in the United Kingdom at the time of the mural's commencement. The intent was for each heart to be "individually hand-painted; utterly unique, just like the loved ones we’ve lost".

History 
The mural was organized by campaign group Covid-19 Bereaved Families for Justice, with the help of the campaign group Led By Donkeys. Volunteers cleaned the wall and removed graffiti before hand-painting approximately 150,000 red hearts over 10 days from 29 March 2021. Bereaved families filled these hearts with messages and the names of lost loved ones, with more continuing to be added over subsequent months.  Though the project was started without council permission, it gained widespread support and public recognition, so has not yet been removed by authorities. As the hearts and text have faded, volunteers continue to repaint hearts with longer-lasting masonry paint, and to rewrite dedications.

Location 
The mural stretches more than  along the South Bank of the River Thames from Westminster Bridge to Lambeth Bridge, opposite the Palace of Westminster. Being outside of St Thomas' Hospital, it also encompasses an older plaque dedicated to the 1994-6 human BSE outbreak.

Reactions
On 29 March 2021, Labour Party leader Keir Starmer visited the mural, which he described as a "remarkable memorial", before calling on Boris Johnson to visit the mural personally and engage with the families of the deceased. Johnson later visited the wall for "quiet reflection" and was criticised by the co-founder of the group, who said that the visit, which did not include a meeting with bereaved families, was "a late evening visit under cover of darkness ... a cynical and insincere move that is deeply hurtful". On 20 April 2021, the Archbishop of Canterbury, Justin Welby, visited the wall, saying "I was unprepared for the visual force of this wall. Because it’s high, It feels like a wave of grief breaking over us."

Future of the mural
As of April 2021, the mural was not considered finished, as volunteers intended to continue to add hearts to match the UK's COVID-19 death toll. In April, plans were reported of using digital scanning technology to count the number of hearts on the wall.

While the original plan for the unauthorised mural included provision to clean the area after a period of time, some campaigners have argued that the mural should remain indefinitely as a permanent memorial. The Prime Minister, Boris Johnson, had previously promised a "fitting and permanent" memorial to those who died from COVID-19 after the conclusion of the pandemic.

Gallery

See also
 List of public art in the London Borough of Lambeth
 London COVID-19 Pandemic Memorial Garden

References

External links

 Official website
 Crowdfunder for the maintenance of the UK Covid Memorial Wall

2021 establishments in England
2021 works
Buildings and structures in the London Borough of Lambeth
Buildings and structures on the River Thames
COVID-19 pandemic monuments and memorials
COVID-19 pandemic in the United Kingdom
Monuments and memorials in London
Murals in London